Alberto Torres (Itaboraí, 1885 - Rio De Janeiro State, 1917) was a politician and a Brazilian social thinker who was concerned about national unity and the organization of the society of Brazil.

In his work, he opposed the ideas of socialism and individualism as incompatible to the Brazilian reality and believed them to be responsible for the disintegration of society. He believed that objectively understanding Brazilian society is necessary to know its needs and to present pragmatic changes to it.

To do so, a strong state must lead changes.

His ideas were very much in use during Brazilian Revolution of 1930 and the 1964 Brazilian coup d'état.

His daughter Heloísa Alberto Torres was a Brazilian anthropologist and museum director.

Works
 O problema nacional brasileiro
 A organização nacional
 As fontes da vida no Brasil, 1915

References
 Rezende, Maria José de. Organização, coordenação e mudança social em Alberto Torres. Estudos de Sociologia, n. 8, 1º sem. 2000.
 Souza, Ricardo Luiz de. Nacionalismo e autoritarismo em Alberto Torres. In: Sociologias, no. 13, 2005, pp. 302–323. 

Brazilian writers
Ministers of Justice of Brazil
1865 births
1917 deaths
People from Itaboraí